Donegal may refer to:

County Donegal, Ireland
 County Donegal, a county in the Republic of Ireland, part of the province of Ulster
 Donegal (town), a town in County Donegal in Ulster, Ireland
 Donegal Bay, an inlet in the northwest of Ireland bordering counties Donegal, Leitrim and Sligo
 Donegal County Council, the authority responsible for local government in County Donegal
 Donegal Castle, a castle in Donegal Town in County Donegal
 Donegal Airport, an  airport in north-west County Donegal
 Donegal GAA, County Board responsible for Gaelic games in County Donegal
 Donegal county football team
 Donegal (Dáil constituency), a parliamentary constituency in the lower house of the Irish parliament since 2016

Canada
 Donegal, Perth County, Ontario
 Donegal, Renfew County, Ontario, in Bonnechere Valley

UK Parliament constituencies
 Donegal (UK Parliament constituency)
 Donegal Borough (Parliament of Ireland constituency), a constituency represented in the Irish House of Commons until 1800
 Donegal County (Parliament of Ireland constituency), a constituency represented in the Irish House of Commons until 1800
 East Donegal (UK Parliament constituency)
 North Donegal (UK Parliament constituency)
 South Donegal (UK Parliament constituency)
 West Donegal (UK Parliament constituency)

United States
 Donegal, Pennsylvania, a borough in Westmoreland County, Pennsylvania
 Donegal School District, a public school district in Lancaster County, Pennsylvania
 Donegal Township, Butler County, Pennsylvania
 Donegal Township, Washington County, Pennsylvania
 Donegal Township, Westmoreland County, Pennsylvania
 East Donegal Township, Lancaster County, Pennsylvania
 West Donegal Township, Lancaster County, Pennsylvania

Other
 HMS Donegal (1798), a 74-gun ship of the line
 HMS Donegal (1858), a 101-gun screw-driven first rate ship of the line
 SS Donegal, Midland Railway passenger ferry ship launched in 1904 and sunk in 1917
 Donegal tweed, a handwoven tweed manufactured in County Donegal
 Donegal Carpets, a brand of handmade wool carpets
 Donegal Creameries, dairy company with operations in Ireland, Britain, the Netherlands and Brazil.

See also
 Donegall (disambiguation)